Svensen or Svensén may refer to
Svensen, Oregon, an unincorporated community in the United States
Åsfrid Svensen (born 1936), Norwegian literary historian
Alf Svensén (1893–1935), Swedish Olympic gymnast 
Helge Svensen (born 1953), Norwegian luger 
Henrik Svensen (1904–2007), Norwegian judge and politician 
June Svensen (born 1954), Norwegian archer
Sven Hans Jørgen Svensen (1856–1942), Norwegian schoolteacher, school inspector and politician